Ninosca Victoria Risbjerg Velásquez (born 18 July 1991, in Copenhagen) is a Danish politician, who is a member of the Folketing for the Red–Green Alliance political party. She was elected at the 2019 Danish general election.

Political career
Velasquez stood in the 2014 European Parliament election for the People's Movement against the EU but was not elected. She ran in the 2019 election for national parliament and was elected for the Red-Green Alliance.

References

External links 
 Biography on the website of the Danish Parliament (Folketinget)

1991 births
Living people
Politicians from Copenhagen
Red–Green Alliance (Denmark) politicians
Women members of the Folketing
21st-century Danish women politicians
Danish eurosceptics
People's Movement against the EU politicians
Members of the Folketing 2019–2022
Members of the Folketing 2022–2026